is a Japanese manga series written and illustrated by Sun Takeda. It was serialized in Kodansha's seinen manga magazine Young Magazine the 3rd from October 2015 to April 2021, and transferred to Monthly Young Magazine in May 2021. Its chapters have been collected in thirteen tankōbon volumes as of January 2023. The manga was licensed by Kodansha Comics in North America. An anime television series adaptation by Pine Jam aired from April to June 2020.

Plot
High school student Shuichi Kagaya receives the ability to transform into a giant monstrous dog. It resembles a mascot costume with a zipper on a back and a big smile on the front. He meets a normal girl from the same class, Claire Aoki, whose sister, Elena, was responsible for killing their parents.

Characters

One of the high school students with the ability to transform into a dog-like mascot costume, complete with a large pistol on the belt and a zipper up his spine which, any female human climbs inside his empty body, increasing physical and mental abilities. When transformed, Shuichi gains the physical ability of a human at peak levels of fitness, strength and endurance, and when paired with a partner inside him it becomes superhuman. He retains some of his abilities in his human form such as a sense of smell even keener than dogs. His human appearance is average with the exception of a noticeable scar around his neck after fighting with Elena.

After witnessing her sister, Elena, transforming into a monster and killing their parents, she fell into depression and attempted suicide when no one believed her. After Shuichi saves Claire, she gets obsessed with finding Elena and the truth behind the creation of monsters. At first, she was abusive toward Shuichi, viewing him as a tool and nothing more, but over time grew to care about him to the point she swore to kill herself should Shuichi die first so they can stay together. Behind her cheerful, and often perverted personality, Claire possesses a determination to kill anyone without hesitation or remorse, and close herself off from her emotions to an extent that Shuichi finds terrifying. Being a regular human, Claire is physically weak, but when she is inside Shuichi, she takes control of his body movements, and receives a massive boost to physical capability and superhuman level. She later uses a coin to gain the power to slow down her perception of time increasing her speed and reflexes. It is revealed that Clair and Elena are maternal half-sisters, due to Clair being born from an affair between her father and one of his mistresses who abandoned Clair when she was young.

Claire's older sister. After receiving the ability to transform into a ghost, she killed her parents, seemingly for the hypocritical manner in which they raised her and Claire with strict rules despite themselves being terrible people. She loves Claire dearly and may be the only person she is unwilling to harm. Emotionally unstable and psychotic even before becoming a monster she has, according to Shuichi after he scented her clothing, committed a staggering number of murders. Elena is revealed she is Shuichi's ex-girlfriend and the one turning him into a monster so she could climb inside him and truly "become one" with him. The idea that anyone else might be inside Shuichi makes Elena upset. She removes his head and find Claire inside him, and he survives due to some unknown ability of his monster form to keep him alive from experiencing injuries.

A member of a highly advanced alien species with the ability to grant seemingly any wish in return for finding golden coins containing one of his fellow aliens. Should anyone locate 100 coins he has even offered to grant that person enough power to do almost anything, even destroy a planet should they wish, seemingly with no regard for how such a power may be abused. 

One of the high school students. She is constantly cheerful, enough so Shuichi once felt better about his terrible life just by having a normal conversation with her. It is suggested she has a crush on Shuichi as she was the one to notice how depressed he was while everyone just thought he looked cooler than he had before. 

One of the high school students. After betraying Shuichi and siding with Madoka's group, Abukawa dies at the river.

One of the Gatherers and a selfish student. She uses a coin she asked the Alien for increased speed in order to excel at sports, but dislikes her abilities after it transformed her arms and legs into monster limbs. She is killed by Claire and Shuichi.

A university student and the first monster siding with Claire and Shuichi. Having found a coin he asked the Alien to make him stronger than anyone else. A martial artist, he created his own martial art style to utilize the strength of his monster body, but finding humans no longer challenged him he has decided to challenge himself against as many monsters as he can. After losing a fight to Claire and Shuichi's teamwork he decided Shuichi was a "real man" and swore to be their ally in finding more coins, even though he himself has no interest in the coins anymore as strength was his only desire. 

A young girl and a member of Koyanagi's Gatherer group. An animal lover with the ability to understand animals. While being human, she has fox ears sprouting on her head, giving her the ability to hear how an animal is feeling. Preferring to keep her ears hidden she usually is seen wearing a motorcycle crash helmet covering her head. 

A young man and member of Koyanagi's Gatherer group. A notorious coward he is easily controlled and manipulated by others, especially those he is scared of. He is in love with Chihiro, but gets into a fear. His monster ability lets him transform his head into a surveillance camera which he uses to follow and record Chihiro. Any recording he makes he can upload to computers or wirelessly online. He later betrays the group and dies at the forest.

A very powerful Gatherer and Elena's friend. He despises being told what to do and enjoys killing people who try, except for Elena who is the only person he can obey with. Rather than transforming into a monster, Subaru summons and controls two large monsters, a male on the left side and a female on the right, calling his Parents. They are immensely strong and do all by fighting for him while he is kept safe between the palms of the hands the Parents have instead of feet.

Media

Manga
Gleipnir is written and illustrated by Sun Takeda. It was serialized in Kodansha's seinen manga magazine Young Magazine the 3rd from October 6, 2015, to April 6, 2021. It was transferred to Monthly Young Magazine on May 20, 2021. Kodansha has compiled its chapters into individual tankōbon volumes. The first volume was published on March 18, 2016. As of January 19, 2023, thirteen volumes were published. The series will end with the 14th volume.

In North America, Kodansha USA announced they had licensed the manga in July 2018. They released the first volume in English on March 19, 2019.

Volume list

Anime
An anime television series adaptation was announced in the fourth issue of Young Magazine the 3rd on March 6, 2019. The series is animated by Pine Jam and directed by Kazuhiro Yoneda, with Shinichi Inotsume handling series composition, and Takahiro Kishida designing the characters. Ryōhei Sataka composes the series' music. It aired from April 5 to June 28, 2020, on Tokyo MX and other channels. Hikaru performs the series' opening theme song, while international music group Mili performs its ending theme song "Ame to Taieki to Nioi". Funimation (now branded as Crunchyroll) has acquired the series globally, excluding Asia and streams the series on FunimationNow, AnimeLab and Wakanim. In Southeast Asia and South Asia, the series is licensed by Medialink, which streams it on the Ani-One YouTube channel in South Asia and select Southeast Asian countries, and on the streaming service Dimsum in Singapore, Malaysia, and Brunei. On December 12, 2020, Funimation announced the series would receive a dub with a two-episode premiere the next day. The Gleipnir DVD and Blu-Ray set was released on July 6, 2021, in North America.

Episode list

Notes

References

External links
 
 

2020 anime television series debuts
Action anime and manga
Anime series based on manga
Fiction about shapeshifting
Funimation
Horror anime and manga
Kodansha manga
Medialink
Pine Jam
Seinen manga
Supernatural thriller anime and manga
Television series about shapeshifting
Tokyo MX original programming